North Shore Football Club Inc, nicknamed the Seagulls, is an Australian rules football and netball club based in the suburb town of North Shore, Victoria.

The club teams currently compete in the Geelong Football Netball League, the premier league in Geelong.

History
The club was formed in 1927 and first tasted success with back to back flags in 1938 and 1939. After the Second World War the club spent many years in the Woolworths Cup competition of the Geelong & District Football League. Promoted to Division one from 1965 they then joined the Geelong Football League when that league was founded in 1979 and won six premierships in a row from 1995 to 2000. 

Some of the more influential names to play for the club through this golden era include Ron Watt, Glenn Keast, Tom Hall, Danny Warren, Simon Riddoch, David Milsome, Wade Chapman, Bill Nicholls, Travis Robertson, Chris Huxtable, Brad "Don't Bowl Here" McDougall and the mercurial Robert Alslop. Due to the removal of the salary cap by the VCFL, North Shore struggled to compete with more affluent clubs for a long period of time but in the 2017 season their hard work started to pay off finishing the season in 7th position led by coach Jason Davenport. Jason Davenport was rewarded for his efforts with a development coaching role with Carlton in the AFL. Sam Darley, a former AFL player with Greater Western Sydney and Western Bulldogs and Richmond VFL captain, is the current coach of the senior team.

Premierships
Geelong Football League
1980, 1981, 1983, 1990, 1993, 1995, 1996, 1997, 1998, 1999, 2000
Geelong & District Football League
1938, 1939, 1948, 1974, 1976, 1977.

Bibliography
 Cat Country: History of Football In The Geelong Region by John Stoward -

References

External links

 Official website

Geelong Football League clubs
1927 establishments in Australia
Geelong & District Football League clubs
Sports clubs established in 1927
Australian rules football clubs established in 1927
Netball teams in Geelong
Australian rules football clubs in Geelong